J.B. Phipps has shown that Crataegus fontanesiana are "somewhat narrow-leaved forms of C. calpodendron". The name was mis-applied for much of the 19th and 20th centuries to some forms of C. crus-galli.

References

fontanesiana